Diadoxus is a genus of beetles in the family Buprestidae, containing the following species:

 Diadoxus erythrurus (White, 1846)
 Diadoxus juengi Blackburn, 1899
 Diadoxus regius Peterson, 1991

References

Buprestidae genera